In mathematical logic, the Friedberg–Muchnik theorem is a theorem about Turing reductions that was proven independently by Albert Muchnik and Richard Friedberg in the middle of the 1950s. It is a more general view of the Kleene–Post theorem. The Kleene–Post theorem states that there exist incomparable languages A and B below K. The Friedberg–Muchnik theorem states that there exist incomparable, computably enumerable languages A and B. Incomparable meaning that there does not exist a Turing reduction from A to B or a Turing reduction from B to A. It is notable for its use of the priority finite injury approach.

See also 
Post's problem

References 

Mathematical logic